West Virginia's 8th Senate district is one of 17 districts in the West Virginia Senate. It is currently represented by Republicans Glenn Jeffries and Mark Hunt. All districts in the West Virginia Senate elect two members to staggered four-year terms.

Geography
District 8 covers parts of Kanawha and Putnam Counties, including much of northern Charleston, the state's capital and largest city. Other communities in the district include Dunbar, Nitro, Cross Lanes, Rand, Sissonville, Buffalo, and Eleanor.

The district is located entirely within West Virginia's 2nd congressional district, and overlaps with the 13th, 35th, 36th, 37th, 38th, 39th, and 40th districts of the West Virginia House of Delegates.

Recent election results

2022

Historical election results

2020

2018

2016

2014

2012

Federal and statewide results in District 8

References

8
Kanawha County, West Virginia
Putnam County, West Virginia